The men's 10 metre air pistol event at the 2019 European Games in Minsk, Belarus took place on 23 June at the Shooting Centre.

Schedule
All times are FET (UTC+03:00)

Records

Results

Qualification
The qualification round took place on 23 June to determine the qualifiers for the finals.

Final
The final round took place on 23 June to determine the final classification.

References

Men's 10m air pistol